Karun Pal (born 1 September 1967) is an Indian former cricketer. He played three first-class matches for Delhi in 1980/81.

See also
 List of Delhi cricketers

References

External links
 

1967 births
Living people
Indian cricketers
Delhi cricketers
Cricketers from Mumbai